In mathematics, a pseudo-canonical variety is an algebraic variety of "general type".

Formal definition
Formally, a variety X is pseudo-canonical if the canonical class is pseudo-ample.

Results
For a non-singular projective variety, a result of Kodaira states that this is equivalent to a divisor in the class being the sum of an ample divisor and an effective divisor.

See also
 Bombieri–Lang conjecture

References
 

Algebraic varieties